Cédric Mickael Avinel (born 11 September 1986) is a professional footballer who plays as a centre-back for  club Ajaccio. Born in metropolitan France, he is a former player of the Guadeloupe national team.

Club career

Créteil and Watford
Born in Paris, Avinel began his career at Créteil. He joined Watford in January 2007, signing an eighteen-month contract. He made his debut on 5 May 2007 against Reading at the Madejski Stadium. He was replaced at half-time by Adrian Mariappa. He went on to make two League Cup appearances for Watford in the 2007–08 season.

Loan to Stafford Rangers
On 14 September 2007, Avinel joined Stafford Rangers on a month-long loan, making eight appearances.

Gueugnon, Cannes, and Clermont
Avinel signed with Gueugnon in January 2009. He played 40 league matches and scored one goal for the club before leaving in the summer of 2010.

On 18 May 2010, Avinel joined Championnat National side Cannes. He made his debut for the club in the 3–0 win over Bayonne on 7 August 2010. On 26 May 2011, Avinel signed a three-year contract with Ligue 2 side Clermont.

International career
Avinel made his debut for Guadeloupe on 4 December 2008, in a 2–1 loss to Cuba in the Caribbean Championship preliminary round.

Honors
Guadeloupe
Caribbean Cup bronze: 2008

References

External links
 
 
 
 
 

1986 births
Living people
Footballers from Paris
Association football defenders
Guadeloupean footballers
Guadeloupe international footballers
French footballers
French people of Guadeloupean descent
Guadeloupean expatriate footballers
US Créteil-Lusitanos players
Watford F.C. players
Stafford Rangers F.C. players
FC Gueugnon players
AS Cannes players
Clermont Foot players
AC Ajaccio players
Premier League players
Ligue 2 players
Expatriate footballers in England
2009 CONCACAF Gold Cup players
Black French sportspeople
Ligue 1 players